Einar Kárason (born 24 November 1955 in Reykjavík, Iceland) is an Icelandic writer. He has been a full-time writer since 1978. He started his career with poetry in literary magazines from 1978 to 1980. In 1981 he published his first novel. He is best known for his novel Þar sem djöflaeyjan rís. which was translated into English as Devil's Island. The book was also made into the film Devil's Island. He has been on the board or acted as chairman for several Icelandic writing associations.

He wrote a book about the Sturlungar family clan, Óvinafagnaður, in which all the most famous Vikings from Iceland come together and finally battle for power over Iceland.

In 1993 Einar Kárason bit Guðjón Þórðarson.

Bibliography

Novels
 Þetta eru asnar Guðjón, 1981
 Þar sem djöflaeyjan rís, 1983
 Gulleyjan, 1985
 Fyrirheitna Landið, 1989
 Heimskra manna ráð, 1992
 Kvikasilfur, 1994
 Norðurljós, 1998

 Óvinafagnaður, 2001
 Stormur, 2003
 Ofsi, 2008
 Skáld, 2012
 Skálmöld, 2014
 Passíusálmarnir, 2016
 Stormfuglar, 2018
 Með sigg á sálinni, 2019

References

External links
 
 Edda.is
 Bokmenntir

1955 births
Einar Karason
Living people
Einar Karason
Einar Karason